Rachel Stuart (born 1972) is a Jamaican-Canadian model, actress and television personality.

Personal life
Stuart attended Mohawk College. Rachel Stuart is married to Paxton Baker, former vice president of BET Digital Networks and has three children.  She currently resides in the Washington D.C., area.

Career
Stuart is a former Miss Caraïbes and Miss Jamaica and represented her country at Miss Universe 1993.   She is best known for her work as hostess of two programs on BET, the BET network:  Caribbean Rhythms, a music video show showcasing musicians from Caribbean nations; and Planet Groove, a music video show that was similar to Video Soul.  Rachel also had brief spots on Video Soul as a guest hostess.  In 1999, she was a co-hostess of BET's Live From LA (with Michael Colyar). She is now the current host of "Island Stylee" an award-winning inflight program on Air Jamaica.

References

External links

1972 births
Canadian people of Jamaican descent
Jamaican beauty pageant winners
Living people
Miss Universe 1993 contestants